Diplomatic presence of the United States of America in Oman started in 1880 when the U.S. set up its consulate in Muscat. The consulate operated in Oman through 1915. U.S. interests in Oman, thereafter, were handled by U.S. diplomats resident in neighboring countries. In 1972, the U.S. ambassador to Kuwait, William Stoltzfus was accredited as the first U.S. ambassador to Oman, and the U.S. embassy, headed by a resident chargé d'affaires, was opened on July 4, 1972.

The first resident U.S. ambassador, William D. Wolle, took up his post in July 1974. U.S. Ambassador Wiley has played important roles in the development of Oman – United States relations, the staging of the Iran Hostage Rescue Attempt from Oman, and making it one of the most reliable Middle Eastern allies of the United States.

The United States Embassy in the Sultanate of Oman is located in Muscat.

Ambassadors
William A. Stoltzfus, Jr. – Career FSO
Title: Envoy Extraordinary and Minister Plenipotentiary. Resident in Kuwait
Appointed: April 17, 1972
Terminated mission: Left post, July 16, 1974
William D. Wolle – Career FSO
Title: Envoy Extraordinary and Minister Plenipotentiary.
Appointed: July 17, 1974
Terminated mission: Left post, April 25, 1978
Marshall W. Wiley – Career FSO
Title: Envoy Extraordinary and Minister Plenipotentiary.
Appointed: November 7, 1978
Terminated mission: Left post, May 19, 1981
John R. Countryman – Career FSO
Title: Envoy Extraordinary and Minister Plenipotentiary.
Appointed: October 14, 1981
Terminated mission: Left post, July 29, 1985
George Cranwell Montgomery – Political appointee
Title: Envoy Extraordinary and Minister Plenipotentiary.
Appointed: September 11, 1985
Terminated mission: Left post, January 18, 1989
Richard Wood Boehm – Career FSO
Title: Envoy Extraordinary and Minister Plenipotentiary.
Appointed: November 12, 1989
Terminated mission: Left post, October 12, 1992
David J. Dunford – Career FSO
Title: Envoy Extraordinary and Minister Plenipotentiary.
Appointed: November 1, 1992
Terminated mission: Left post, June 21, 1995
Frances D. Cook – Career FSO
Title: Envoy Extraordinary and Minister Plenipotentiary.
Appointed: January 2, 1996
Terminated mission: Left post, January 10, 1999
John B. Craig – Career FSO
Title: Envoy Extraordinary and Minister Plenipotentiary.
Appointed: February 15, 1999
Terminated mission: Left post, September 22, 2001
Robert W. Dry – Career FSO
Title: Envoy Extraordinary and Minister Plenipotentiary. Ad Interim
Appointed: September 22, 2001
Terminated mission: Left post, October 2002
Richard L. Baltimore III – Career FSO
Title: Envoy Extraordinary and Minister Plenipotentiary.
Appointed: November 5, 2002
Terminated mission: Left post, March 5, 2006
Gary A. Grappo – Career FSO
Title: Envoy Extraordinary and Minister Plenipotentiary.
Appointed: March 6, 2006
Terminated mission: Left post, August 20, 2009
Richard J. Schmierer – Career FSO
Title: Envoy Extraordinary and Minister Plenipotentiary
Appointed: July 13, 2009
Terminated mission: Left post, August 3, 2012
Greta C. Holtz - Career FSO
Title: Envoy Extraordinary and Minister Plenipotentiary
Appointed: August 3, 2012
Terminated mission: Left post, December 7, 2015
Marc J. Sievers - Career FSO
Title: Envoy Extraordinary and Minister Plenipotentiary
Appointed: November 23, 2015
Terminated mission: November 30, 2019
Leslie Tsou - Career FSO
Title: Envoy Extraordinary and Minister Plenipotentiary
Appointed: December 31, 2019
Arrives at Embassy: January 10, 2020
Terminated mission: Incumbent

Notes

See also
Oman – United States relations
Foreign relations of Oman
Ambassadors of the United States

References
United States Department of State: Background notes on Oman

External links
 United States Department of State: Chiefs of Mission for Oman
 United States Department of State: Oman
 United States Embassy in Muscat

Oman

United States